Shintotsukawa Dam  is an earthfill dam located in Hokkaido Prefecture in Japan. The dam is used for irrigation. The catchment area of the dam is 16 km2. The dam impounds about 58  ha of land when full and can store 4935 thousand cubic meters of water. The construction of the dam was started on 1952 and completed in 1959.

References

Dams in Hokkaido